Abu Feras Alhamdani is an Iraqi politician, Leading member of Eradaa Movement, Political analyst, Media personality and former TV presenter.

Bio
Alhamdani,(Born in Baghdad 1974)is an Iraqi politician ,.He entered the Iraqi elections as a candidate for the Eradaa Movement.He is a Leading member of Eradaa Movement. Also he was also a media personality and former TV presenter Al Rasheed TV.

Positions
 Member of Eradaa Movement A representative of the province of Baghdad.
 Political analyst, Media personality and former TV presenter.

Arrest 
The Qatari authorities detained Iraqi media personality and the program's presenter in the Al Rasheed TV, Abu Feras Alhamdani after the end of a television program broadcast by Al-Jazeera, which hosted the candidate of "Karama" "Najah Al-Mezan", who did not win the last parliamentary elections held on 30 April.

The episode of Al-Jazeera TV program "The Opposite Direction" presented by the journalist Faisal al-Qassem was a sharp verbal argument that developed into a clash with the hands. The focus of the episode was "The security situation in Iraq and the battle of the Iraqi army with bandits." Al-Hamdani lined up alongside the security forces, Al-Mizan is a daisy, causing clashes and clashes with his hands.

See also
 Eradaa Movement
 Hanan Saeed Mohsen al-Fatlawi

References

External links
 An Interview with Abu Feras Alhamdani on BBC Arabic
 An Interview with Abu Feras Alhamdani on Alahad TV
 An Interview with Abu Feras Alhamdani on Al-Baghdadia TV
 An Interview with Abu Feras Alhamdani on Al Iraqiya

Iraqi soldiers
Living people
1974 births
Politicians from Baghdad
Iraqi Shia Muslims